Manipay Velakkai Pillaiyar Temple is a temple in the town of Manipay, Jaffna, Sri Lanka devoted to the Hindu deity, Murugan. The temple was built by Gate Mudaliyar Sivakolundu of Manipay and has been kept in the hands of his descendants to this day. Revenue for the temple is relatively low as compared to other temples on the island considering its location in a relatively unpopulated area; consequently, its upkeep and festivities is mainly paid for by the trustees of the temple and their family members, all of whom are descendants of Mudaliyar Sivakolundu.

Trustees

See also 
Hinduism in Sri Lanka 
Manipay

Notes

External links

Hindu temples in Jaffna District
Murugan temples in Sri Lanka